Village People is an American disco group known for its on-stage costumes and suggestive lyrics in their music. The group was originally formed by French producers Jacques Morali, Henri Belolo and lead singer Victor Willis following the release of the debut album Village People, which targeted disco's large gay audience. The group's name refers to Manhattan's Greenwich Village, with its reputation as a gay neighborhood. The characters were a symbolic group of American masculinity and macho gay-fantasy personas. To date, Willis is the only original member still remaining with the group.

The group quickly became popular and moved into the mainstream, scoring several disco and dance hits internationally, including the hit singles "Macho Man", "In the Navy", "Go West", and "Y.M.C.A.", which was their biggest hit. In March 2020, the Library of Congress described "Y.M.C.A." as "an American phenomenon", and added the song to the National Recording Registry, which preserves audio recordings considered to be "culturally, historically or aesthetically significant".

History

1977–1979 
French musical composer and producer Jacques Morali and his business partner Henri Belolo, known collectively as Can't Stop Productions, were enjoying a successful string of hits in France and Europe. In 1977, they moved to New York City to attempt to break into the American market. Morali had written a few dance tunes when he was given a demo tape recorded by singer/actor Victor Willis. After hiring Willis to sing background vocals on the four tracks, Morali approached him and said, "I had a dream that you sang lead on my album and it went very, very big". Willis agreed to sing on the debut album Village People.

Songwriters Phil Hurtt and Peter Whitehead wrote the lyrics for the first album (Willis would subsequently take over writing duties in 1978 for the group's biggest hits). The Village People studio band was called Gypsy Lane, conducted by Horace Ott, who also provided much of the musical arrangements for Morali, who did not play any instruments.

The album became an international hit, and demand for live appearances soon followed. Morali hastily built a group of dancers around Willis to perform in clubs and videos. Morali met the first recruit, Felipe Rose (who claims indigenous American descent and dressed as a Native American), in a New York gay bar called the Anvil. Willis hand-picked Alex Briley (who initially appeared in nondescript costumes before switching to G.I. uniforms). The others were Mark Mussler (construction worker), Dave Forrest (cowboy), Lee Mouton (leatherman/biker), and Peter Whitehead (one of the group's early songwriters), who appeared on American Bandstand and in the video for the group's first hit, "San Francisco (You Got Me)".

With record sales soaring, Morali and Willis saw the need to create a permanent group. They took out an ad in a theatre trade paper which read: "Macho Types Wanted: Must Dance And Have A Moustache."  Glenn Hughes (leatherman), David Hodo (construction worker) and Randy Jones (cowboy) were among the hundreds who answered the ad.

With the "official" lineup in place, the group did a hasty photo-shoot for the cover of the already-recorded Macho Man album. The album's title track catapulted the group into the mainstream, and their single "Y.M.C.A.", from the group's third album Cruisin', became one of the most popular hits of the 1970s.

In 1979, the United States Navy considered using their single "In the Navy" in a television and radio recruiting campaign. Belolo offered them permission if the Navy would help film a music video for it. This song was also performed on the TV series The Love Boat and Married... with Children,  and in the 1996 comedy film Down Periscope.

The group's fame peaked in 1979 with a three-month North American tour, several appearances on The Merv Griffin Show and American Bandstand, and performing with Bob Hope to entertain US troops. They were also featured on the cover of Rolling Stone, Vol. 289, April 19, 1979. Willis left the group in August 1979, during production of the upcoming musical movie tentatively titled Discoland: Where the Music Never Ends. He was replaced by Ray Simpson, the brother of Valerie Simpson (of Ashford & Simpson) who had previously sung background vocals with the group on their 1979 tour. The end of 1979 saw the release of Live and Sleazy, a double album featuring Victor Willis on lead vocals on the "Live" disc and Simpson's debut with the group on the "Sleazy" disc.

1980–1985 
In June 1980, the feature film now retitled Can't Stop the Music was released. The film was directed by Nancy Walker, written by Allan Carr and Bronte Woodard, music and lyrics by Jacques Morali (except Willis who penned the lyrics to "Milkshake" and "Magic Night") and starring Steve Guttenberg, Valerie Perrine, Jean-Claude Billmaer, and Bruce Jenner.  By the time it was released disco's popularity had waned.  At the March 1981 Golden Raspberry Awards, the movie was named Worst Picture and Worst Screenplay, and was nominated in almost all the other categories. Although the title song became a club play chart success and moderate radio hit, it was nominated for Worst Original Song "Razzie" and did not live up to sales expectations, never obtaining gold status as a single or album. The soundtrack also featured the talents of David London, who under his real name Dennis "Fergie" Frederiksen became the future lead singer of Toto and one of the main contributors to Village People's next album. The group embarked on a tour in promotion of the film in Australia and Japan. The Japanese show was filmed at Budokan and released on DVD as Village People Live In Japan.

The group appeared in the November 22, 1980, episode of Love Boat (season four, episode seven). At the end of 1980, Jeff Olson joined the group as the cowboy.

In 1981, with new wave music becoming more popular than disco, Morali and Belolo ditched the familiar characters and re-branded Village People with a new look inspired by the New Romantic movement, and released the album Renaissance. It only attracted minor, mostly negative attention, but it did produce the group's first hit single in Italy with "5 O'clock in the Morning".

Willis rejoined the group briefly in late 1981 for the writing and recording of the album Fox on the Box, which was released in 1982 in Europe and Japan, and in 1983 in the United States under the title In the Street. David Hodo and Ray Simpson both left the group in 1982 with Mark Lee and Miles Jaye replacing them respectively. Jaye contributed lead vocals to a single in 1983 called "America", which would be added as an extra track to the 1999 remaster of In the Street. In 1984, the group sang background vocals on a disco version of "Where The Boys Are" by Lorna Luft.

Their next album, the 1985 dance/Hi-NRG release Sex Over the Phone, was not a huge commercial success, but it fared better in sales and club play than Renaissance. The title track, when released as a single, was banned by the BBC because of its subject matter: credit-card phone sex. Despite this, it did peak at 59 on the UK singles chart. The album featured yet another new lead singer, Ray Stephens (of The Great Space Coaster fame). It was the group's last album of new material until A Village People Christmas in 2018. Py Douglas came in to sub for Stephens for some of the group's live appearances in 1985 and can be seen in both promotional videos made for the group.

In 1985 the group took a hiatus, but returned in 1987 with the line-up of Randy Jones, David Hodo, Felipe Rose, Glenn Hughes, Alex Briley, and Ray Simpson and formed Sixuvus Ltd a group that managed the affairs of the group and had the license to use the name Village People and its characters in use until 2017.

1990s–present 

The 1990s brought a resurgence for the Village People.  On September 22, 1991, they performed in front of 41,815 in Sydney, Australia, as part of the pre-game entertainment for the New South Wales Rugby League Grand Final held at the Sydney Football Stadium.   They also performed a medley of self-parody songs at the MTV Movie Awards – "In the Movies" ("In the Navy"), "Psycho Bitch" ("Macho Man"), and "My MTV" ("Y.M.C.A."). The group also made a guest appearance on the hit show Married... with Children in the episode "Take My Wife, Please".

Founder Jacques Morali died of complications related to AIDS in Paris on November 15, 1991.  Three years later, the Village People recorded with the Germany national football team on its official World Cup '94 song Far Away in America. In 1995, Eric Anzalone replaced Glenn Hughes as the Leatherman/Biker, and made his music video debut with Kelsey Grammer, Rob Schneider, and other cast members during the end-credits of the film Down Periscope, performing "In The Navy" with Ray Simpson on lead vocals.

At the beginning of the 21st century Village People released two singles, "Gunbalanya" (2000) and "Loveship 2001" (2001) under the name "Amazing Veepers".  It was reported in 2001 that 'Gunbalanya', which was recorded with indigenous Australian people, took its title from a word meaning "in the tribe" though it is in fact the name of an Aboriginal settlement. Leatherman/Biker Glenn Hughes died of lung cancer in New York City on March 4, 2001.  Village People performed as the opening act for Cher on her Farewell Tour until it ended in April 2005.  Former cowboy Randy Jones married Will Grega, his boyfriend of 20 years.

Later in the 2000s Village People continued to make appearances worldwide.  The original lead singer and "cop", Victor Willis, was arrested over drug and weapon related charges. On September 12, 2008, Village People received a star on the Hollywood Walk of Fame.  Willis was not in attendance at the ceremony. Willis gave his first live concert in 28 years in Las Vegas on August 3, 2007, and married Karen, a lawyer and executive, later that year.  In May 2012 Willis won a landmark ruling in the first case heard regarding the Copyright Act of 1976, which allows recording artists and writers to reclaim their master recordings and publishing rights initially granted to record companies and publishers after 35 years. He recaptured copyrights including "Y.M.C.A.", "Go West", "Magic Night", "Milkshake", and "In the Navy".  Willis also began to recapture his 33% share of songs he co-wrote.

In August 2013, Village People released a new song "Let's Go Back to the Dance Floor", written by Harry W. Casey of K.C. and the Sunshine Band.  Jim Newman joined the group as the Cowboy, and in October 2013 Bill Whitefield joined as the Construction Worker, a role he had filled in for the group over the years for David Hodo who retired.  Continuing his legal quest, Willis reclaimed ownership of "Y.M.C.A." and other songs written with Jacques Morali, with the removal of Henri Belolo, previously credited as a third writer. Victor Willis released Solo Man, an album he recorded in 1979 featuring the Village People band. Willis appeared as himself on the game show "To Tell The Truth" and performed "Y.M.C.A." the following year.

Village People continued to make television appearances, such as performing "Y.M.C.A." during halftime of the Chicago Bulls game as part of '70s Night. They also made several commercials including LetGo commercial debuts during the Rio Olympics, and a series of commercials in the UK for YOPA online estate agents.

In 2017, after years of legal battles over royalties and songwriting credits, Willis and Can't Stop Productions settled their differences resulting in Willis obtaining the license to use the name and characters of Village People and returning as the original lead singer (with a new group of background singers).  Can't Stop also terminated the license of Sixuvus (the group which had been performing as Village People for numerous years with various members).  The trademark "Village People" then became the subject of litigation.

In 2018, the US District Court denied Sixuvus' preliminary injunction and ruled that only one group was entitled to use the Village People trademark, the group featuring original lead singer Victor Willis.  Felipe Rose (original Native American)  launched his solo career and released the single "Going Back To My Roots" (a cover of the 1977 Odyssey dance hit) which received Best Dance Record Award at the 2018 Native American Music Awards. Changes to the new Village People lineup took place when Leatherman Josh Cartier was replaced by J.J. Lippold before the rebranded group's first appearance at the Streamys Awards.  G.I./Sailor Sonny Earl was replaced by Atlanta native James Lee who filled in for him on more shows than he performed. In November 2018. Village People release their first studio album in 33 years, A Village People Christmas.

On August 3, 2019, Village People co-creator Henri Belolo died aged 82. On November 4, 2019, the group's Christmas album was re-released as Magical Christmas and included two additional tracks. On December 21, 2019, the group released its first Christmas single, "Happiest Time of the Year".  On December 31 the Village People performed live in Times Square on Fox's New Year's Eve with Steve Harvey and broke a world record for attendees doing the Y.M.C.A. dance (a record formerly held by the previous touring group).

On April 21, 2020, the Village People released a new single, "If You Believe", which hit #25 on Billboards Adult Contemporary chart. This was the first Top 25 hit for the group in 40 years. On June 9, Victor Willis demanded that President Donald Trump not use Village People music at his rallies in particular "Macho Man" and "Y.M.C.A." while on September 11 Willis was okay with him using "Y.M.C.A" at his campaign rallies. On September 22 the Village People were confirmed to be featured in the song "My Agenda" from the Dorian Electra album My Agenda (2020). On October 24 Saturday Night Live performed a parody of the group's reaction to Donald Trump's use of their music at his rallies. On October 30, Willis clarified his and the group's position against Trump's use of his music at his rallies. On November 7, supporters of President-elect Joe Biden celebrated his victory by dancing in the streets and singing "Y.M.C.A." across the United States.

In November 2022, a third single, "Magic Christmas," was released from the group's Magical Christmas album and entered the Billboard a/c chart at #23, the highest chart entry for any Village People single.

In popular culture

Due to their easily recognizable characters, the group have frequently been imitated or parodied in movies, television series, video games and music. Numerous covers and homages of their songs have been recorded. Examples of homages and parody include an episode of the 1990s CGI show ReBoot, a scene in the 1993 film Wayne's World 2, a mention in the 1991 comedy City Slickers, a 1993 episode of Married... with Children, the 1997 video for U2's single "Discotheque", a 2000 episode of 3rd Rock From the Sun, and the 2013 animated film Despicable Me 2.

The leather-clad biker character with a horseshoe mustache has also become a widespread pop culture icon associated with gay culture, and "Y.M.C.A." has become something of an anthem of the LGBT community. According to Jack Fritscher, Jacques Morali drew his inspiration for the character from the dress code of the gay BDSM leather bar and sex club The Mineshaft. Leather man Hughes frequented the club.

In AllMusic's entry on the group, Ron Wynn summarized them as "part clever concept, part exaggerated camp act" who were "worldwide sensations during disco's heyday and keep reviving like the phoenix." Village Voice critic Robert Christgau originally found the group to be a humorous annoyance, but warmed to their music after listening to the 1978 album Cruisin'; he wrote in Christgau's Record Guide: Rock Albums of the Seventies (1981): "I give up—I've never been capable of resisting music this silly. At least this time they're not singing the praises of 'macho,' a term whose backlash resurgence is no laughing matter, and the gay stereotyping—right down to 'The Women,' every one a camp heroine of screen or disc—is so cartoonish that I can't imagine anyone taking it seriously. As for all the straights who think 'Y.M.C.A.' is about playing basketball, well, that's pretty funny too."

Discography

 Village People (1977)
 Macho Man (1978)
 Cruisin' (1978)
 Go West (1979)
 Live and Sleazy (1979)
 Can't Stop the Music (1980)
 Renaissance (1981)
 Fox on the Box (1982)
 Sex Over the Phone (1985)
 A Village People Christmas (2018)

Lineup

Original seven members 
 Victor Willis (Cop/Admiral/Athlete/Gigolo/nondescript)
 Felipe Rose (Native American)
 Alex Briley (GI/nondescript)
 Lee Mouton (Biker)
 Mark Mussler (Construction worker)
 David Forrest (Cowboy)
 Peter Whitehead (nondescript)

1977 to 1979 
 Victor Willis (Cop/Admiral/Athlete/Gigolo/nondescript)
 Felipe Rose (Native American)
 Alex Briley (GI/Sailor)
 Glenn Hughes (Leather man)
 David Hodo (Construction worker)
 Randy Jones (Cowboy)

1979 to 1980  
 Ray Simpson (Cop)
 Felipe Rose (Native American)
 Alex Briley (GI/Sailor)
 Glenn Hughes (Leather man)
 David Hodo (Construction worker)
 Randy Jones (Cowboy)

1981 to 1982 
 Victor Willis (Cop)
 Ray Simpson (Cop)
 Felipe Rose (Native American)
 Alex Briley (GI/Sailor)
 Glenn Hughes (Leather man)
 David Hodo (Construction worker)
 Jeff Olson (Cowboy)

1982 to 1984 
 Miles Jaye (Cop)
 Felipe Rose (Native American)
 Alex Briley (GI/Sailor)
 Glenn Hughes (Leather man)
 Mark Lee (Construction worker)
 Jeff Olson (Cowboy)

1984 to 1985 
 Ray Stephens (Cop)
 Felipe Rose (Native American)
 Alex Briley (GI/Sailor)
 Glenn Hughes (Leather man)
 Mark Lee (Construction worker)
 Jeff Olson (Cowboy)

1987 to 1990 
 Ray Simpson (Cop)
 Felipe Rose (Native American)
 Alex Briley (GI/Sailor)
 Glenn Hughes (Leather man)
 David Hodo (Construction worker)
 Randy Jones (Cowboy)

1990 to 1995 
 Ray Simpson (Cop)
 Felipe Rose (Native American)
 Alex Briley (GI/Sailor)
 Glenn Hughes (Leather man)
 David Hodo (Construction worker)
 Jeff Olson (Cowboy)

1995 to 2013 
 Ray Simpson (Cop)
 Felipe Rose (Native American)
 Alex Briley (GI/Sailor)
 Eric Anzalone (Leather man)
 David Hodo (Construction worker)
 Jeff Olson (Cowboy)

2013 to 2017 
 Ray Simpson (Cop/Admiral)
 Felipe Rose (Native American)
 Alex Briley (GI/Sailor)
 Eric Anzalone (Leather man)
 Bill Whitefield (Construction worker)
 Jim Newman (Cowboy)

2017 to 2018 
 Victor Willis (Cop/Admiral)
 Angel Morales (Native American)
 Sonny Earl (GI)
 J.J. Lippold (Leather man)
 James Kwong (Construction worker)
 Chad Freeman (Cowboy)

2018 to 2020 
 Victor Willis (Cop/Admiral)
 Angel Morales (Native American)
 James Lee (GI)
 J.J. Lippold (Leather man)
 James Kwong  (Construction worker)
 Chad Freeman (Cowboy)

Since 2021 
 Victor Willis (Cop/Admiral)
 Isaac Lopez (Native American)
 James Lee (GI)
 J.J. Lippold (Leather man)
 James Kwong  (Construction worker)
 Nicholas Manelick (Cowboy)

Temporary members 
 Py Douglas briefly replaced Ray Stephens in some television appearances during the group's 1985 European tour and appears in the promotional videos for "Sex Over The Phone" and "New York City".
 Alec Timerman stood in for Alex Briley on occasion between 2001 and 2003.
 Richard Montoya also replaced David Hodo on some 2008 dates.
 Angel Morales filled in for Felipe Rose in 2008–2010, later replacing Felipe Rose.
 Ray Rodriguez stand-in for Felipe Rose in 2011–2013.
 Stephen Hewitt stood in for Felipe Rose for 12 dates of the North American leg of the 2013 tour.
 A. J. Perrelli stood in for Jeff Olson in 2013. Perrelli died on October 16, 2013, from a head injury.
 Pacho Andrews, stand-in for Felipe Rose in 2013.
 James Lee, stand-in for Sonny Earl in 2017–2018, eventually replacing Sonny Earl.

Timeline

See also 

 List of artists who reached number one in Ireland
 List of artists who reached number one on the US Dance chart
 List of number-one dance hits (United States)

References

External links 

 
 Village People at Rolling Stone
 Official website of Victor Willis

 
American dance music groups
American disco groups
American disco musicians
American hi-NRG groups
Bands with fictional stage personas
Musical groups from New York City
Casablanca Records artists
LGBT-themed musical groups
Musical groups established in 1977
1977 establishments in New York City